Marzena Trybała (born 16 November 1950) is a Polish actress. She has appeared in more than 50 films and television shows since 1971.

Selected filmography
 No End (1985)
 Sachsens Glanz und Preußens Gloria (1985)
 Blind Chance (1987)
 Korczak (1990)
 Just Beyond This Forest (1991)
 Our Love (2000)

References

External links

1950 births
Living people
Polish film actresses
Actresses from Kraków